Hold That Hypnotist is a 1957 film starring the comedy team of The Bowery Boys.  The film was released on March 10, 1957 by Allied Artists and is the forty-fourth film in the series.

Plot
The Bowery Boys' landlady Mrs. Kelly believes in a theory proposed by Dr. Simon Noble that through hypnosis, one can regress into a former life, or lives, from the past. Sach is hypnotized and recounts stories from several past lives. Evidently Sach once lived as Algy Winkle, an English tax collector in Charleston, South Carolina. Winkle managed to get a map from the famous pirate Captain Blackbeard leading to buried treasure, which becomes the focal point of the story.

Cast

The Bowery Boys
Huntz Hall as Horace Debussy 'Sach' Jones/Algy Winkle
Stanley Clements as Stanislaus 'Duke' Covelske/Bartender
David Gorcey as Charles 'Chuck' Anderson/Customer (Credited as David Condon)
Jimmy Murphy as Myron/Customer

Remaining cast
Queenie Smith as Mrs. Kate Kelly
Jane Nigh as Cleo Daniels/Wench
Robert Foulk as Dr. Simon Noble
James Flavin as Jake Morgan
Murray Alper as Gail
Dick Elliott as Clerk
Mel Welles as Blackbeard

Cast notes
Last appearance of Mrs. Kelly.
In Sach's Algy Winkle flashback, Duke appears as a bartender at a pub, while Chuck and Myron are customers at the pub, and Cleo Daniels as a waitress.

Home media
Warner Archives released the film on made-to-order DVD in the United States as part of "The Bowery Boys, Volume Four" on August 26, 2014.

See also
 List of American films of 1957

References

External links

1957 films
1957 comedy films
American black-and-white films
Bowery Boys films
American comedy films
Films about hypnosis
Allied Artists films
1950s English-language films
1950s American films